Events in the year 1964 in Bulgaria.

Incumbents 

 General Secretaries of the Bulgarian Communist Party: Todor Zhivkov
 Chairmen of the Council of Ministers: Todor Zhivkov

Events 

 Srebyrnite grivni, one of the first rock music groups in Bulgaria, was created in Sofia.
 The A.S. Popov School of Electronics in Veliko Tarnovo was founded.

 HC CSKA Sofia, an ice hockey team from Sofia that currently plays in the Bulgarian Hockey League, was founded.

References 

 
1960s in Bulgaria
Years of the 20th century in Bulgaria
Bulgaria
Bulgaria